The Yokohama War Crimes Trials was a series of trials of 996 Japanese war criminals, held before the military commission of the U.S. 8th Army at Yokohama immediately after the Second World War. The defendants belonged to class B and C, as defined by the charter of the International Military Tribunal for the Far East.  Of those tried, 854 defendants were convicted, with 124 of them receiving death sentences, of which 51 were carried out. All of the convicts served their sentences or were executed at Sugamo Prison. In 1958, those still serving prison sentences from the trials were all paroled.

Notable defendants 
Captain Kaichi Hirate: Permitted the mistreatment and murder of Allied POWs. Executed in 1946.

Lieutenant General Tasuku Okada: Ordered the summary executions of 38 American POWs. Executed in 1949.

Major General Yoshitaka Kawane and Colonel Kurataro Hirano: Convicted of ordering the Bataan Death March. Executed together in 1949.

Lieutenant General Isamu Yokoyama: Convicted of having command responsibility for vivisection and other human medical experiments performed at the Kyushu Imperial University on downed Allied airmen. Sentenced to death in 1948, but later reprieved. Died in prison in 1952.

Lieutenant General Eitaro Uchiyama: Convicted of having command responsibility over the execution of dozens of American airmen shot down between April and August 1945. Sentenced to 30 years of hard labor. Paroled in 1958. Died in 1973.

References 

Aftermath of World War II in Japan
International Military Tribunal for the Far East
Yokohama